The Alfabeto Unificado para a Escrita do Caboverdiano (Unified Alphabet for Cape Verdean Writing), commonly known as ALUPEC, is the alphabet that was officially recognized by the Cape Verdean government to write Cape Verdean Creole.

Description 
The ALUPEC is a phonetic writing system based on the Latin script and states only which letters should be used to represent each sound. The system does not establish rules for spelling (orthography). For that reason, Cape Verdean creole writing is not standardized; the same word or the same sentence may appear written in different ways. Cape Verdeans write idiosyncratically — that is, each person writes in his or her own dialect, sociolect, and idiolect.

The descriptive texts concerning the ALUPEC claim that it is "a system composed by 23 letters and four digraphs". What those texts do not specify is that the ALUPEC also includes the letter Y and the digraph RR.

Older documents, such as the 1994 Proposed Criteria of the Unified Alphabet for the Cape Verdean Writing System, showed the following order:
A B S D E F G H I J DJ L LH M N NH N̈ O P K R T U V X TX Z

Later documents (after 1998) show the following order:
A B D DJ E F G H I J K L LH M N NH N̈ O P R S T TX U V X Z

The ALUPEC comes close to a perfect phonetic system in that almost every letter represents only one sound and almost every sound is represented by only one letter. The vowels may have a graphic accent, but the system does not consider letters with accents as separate letters.

Additional notes:
The letter y is used only to represent the copulative conjunction (corresponding to "e" in Portuguese, which means and), in the same fashion as in Spanish.
The letter r has the sound  only in the beginning of the words.
The letter n in the end of the syllables is not pronounced, it only indicates the nasality of the preceding vowel.
The personal pronoun that represents the subject form of the first person of the singular (English “I”) is always written with the capital letter N, whatever the pronunciation, whatever the Creole variant.
This mostly corresponds to the (European) Portuguese s, except, as noted, the intervocalic s (pronounced  in Portuguese). See Portuguese phonology.
When writing Barlavento Creoles, the letter e is written in the place of vowels that would exist in equivalent Sotavento words. If this written vowel was simply omitted, syllables could be left without vowels, or consonants left at the end of a word, in ways deemed improper. For example:
 is written debóxe, not dbóx (compare Sotavento dibaxu)
 is written amedjeres, not amdjers (Sotavento mudjeris)This is a contradiction within the ALUPEC, which intends to be a phonetic system in that every letter should represent only one sound and every sound should be represented by only one letter. Some words in Barlavento Creoles will have, therefore, a dubious representation, with the pronunciation to be deduced by context. Examples:

History 
The ALUPEC emerged in 1994, from the alphabet proposed by the Colóquio Linguístico de Mindelo, in 1979.

On 20 July 1998, the ALUPEC was approved  by the Conselho de Ministros de Cabo Verde, for a five-year trial period. According to the same council, the ALUPEC would "take into account the diversity of the Cape Verdean Language in all the islands, and only after that trial period its introduction in schools would be considered".

In 2005, the ALUPEC was recognized by the Cape Verdean government as a viable system for writing the Cape Verdean Creole, becoming the first (and) only alphabet to attain such status. Nevertheless, the same law allows the usage of alternative writing models, "as long they are presented in a systematized and scientific way".

In 2009, Decree-Law No. 8/2009 officially institutionalized the use of the ALUPEC. 

In spite of having been officially recognized by the Government, the usage of ALUPEC is neither official nor mandatory.

References

External links 
Capeverdean Alphabet (ALUPEC) (Alfabetu Kabuverdianu)
Proposed Criteria of the Unified Alphabet for the Cape Verdean Writing System
Na diféza di un skrita pa kriolu di Kabu Verdi (in Creole)
Pa Nu Skrebe Na Skola (in Portuguese)
Orthographic guidelines for writing São Vicentean Kriol — a proposal for São Vicente Creole writing

Latin alphabets
Cape Verdean Creole